Nilambare is a 2006 Sri Lankan Sinhalese romantic film directed by Kalum Palitha Mahirathna and produced by Upul Jayasinha for Nilwala Films. It stars Ranjan Ramanayake, Sanath Gunathilake, and Dilhani Ekanayake in lead roles along with Semini Iddamalgoda, and Sangeetha Weeraratne. Music composed by Sarath de Alwis. It is the 1069th Sri Lankan film in the Sinhalese cinema.

Plot

Cast
 Ranjan Ramanayake as Nirwan
 Dilhani Ekanayake as Samadhi
 Ravindra Randeniya as Jayasuriya
 Sanath Gunathilake as Nimal
 Semini Iddamalgoda as Nimal's wife
 Veena Jayakody
 Anarkali Akarsha as Sherine
 Sangeetha Weeraratne as Madhu
 Anton Jude as Podiyan
 Ratnawali Kekunawala as mother of Nimal and Nirwan
 Kanchana Kodithuwakku as Sudesh
 Anjula Rajapakse as Shalani
 Hector Dias

Soundtrack

References

2006 films
2000s Sinhala-language films